Win The Battle is the 12th studio album by Canadian punk rock band D.O.A. The Slogan on the back cover (Talk - Action = 0) was later used as the title for their 2010 release.
All songs are written by Joe Keithley except where noted.

The album is dedicated to the memory of Ginger Goodwin (early BC labour organizer) and to Dimwit. Dimwit was Chuck Biscuits's brother and was in The Skulls together with Joe Keithley. The last song on the album is about Dimwit and how he died.

Track listing
All songs written by Joey Shithead, except where noted.
 Dead Men Tell No Tales
 We're Drivin' to Hell N' Back
 Just Say No to the WTO
 If I Were a Redneck
 All Across The U.S.A. Featuring Bif Naked (LP only)
 I Am Canadian
 Warmonger
 The Beer Liberation Army
 La Grange (ZZ Top)
 Fuck You w/ the Blues	(Gerry Hannah)	
 Curbstomp the Devil
 Mexican Holiday
 Return to Lumberjack City
 Junk City Nowhere (Vancouver)

Personnel

The band
 The Great Baldini – drums
 Randy Rampage – Bass
 Joey Shithead - guitar, vocals

Additional musicians
 Bif Naked on All Across The U.S.A.
 Billy Hopeless - vocals
 Michael Rowe - vocals
 Jason Overy percussion
 Shiloh Lindsay - vocals

References
 (http://www.allmusic.com/album/win-the-battle-r616888) review at Allmusic.com

2002 albums
D.O.A. (band) albums
Sudden Death Records albums